Adultcentrism is the exaggerated egocentrism of adults, including the belief that an adult perspective is inherently better (when compared to that of children). It is used to describe the conditions facing children and youth in schools, homes, and community settings; however, adultcentrism is not always based on a notion of being good or bad, in contrast to adultism.

Definition
In social work, adultcentrism has been recognized as the potential bias adults have in understanding and responding to children. This bias is said to extend from the difference in age between the child and the adult. The differences—including language, communication styles and world view—can create a hurdle to overcome.  Rather than allowing the adult to simply share their view, adultcentrism acknowledges the powerlessness and inability of young people to actually affect the systems of authority adults have created. This creates barriers to effective practice with children; adultcentrism is said to be akin to egocentrism, where one puts their personal perspectives, needs and beliefs ahead of all others, as well as ethnocentrism, which places a person's cultural and social beliefs ahead of all others. Explaining adultcentrism, one author reports,

Areas of usage
In the field of occupational therapy adultcentrism has been said to "lead researchers to underestimate children's abilities." According to one researcher, "This stance can be seen when researchers assume they know everything they need to know about children because they have been children." Research has also shown this leads adults to stay within their own perspective, thus discriminating against children through adultism. In respect to occupational therapy, "Adultcentrism has emerged in the family therapy literature to describe the tendency by adults to view the world from an adult perspective and in so doing not understand or appreciate how children and young people are viewing things."

Adultcentrism is also growing in importance in the fields of education, mental health, community sociology, and children's empowerment. One international affairs specialist reflects that,

From this notion "education leaders, teachers, school board members and reform advocates... call for the same improvements, the same tasks, and the same accountabilities that have been always called for; increased standardization, decreased student motivation, and increased teacher attrition."

A growing number of youth empowerment organizations and youth-led organizations identify adultcentrism as central to their analysis, as well. One such organization, the National Youth Rights Association, identifies adultcentrism in society as a cause that,

See also

References

Adulthood
Age and society
Youth
Ageism
Children's rights